An island platform (also center platform, centre platform) is a station layout arrangement where a single platform is positioned between two tracks within a railway station, tram stop or transitway interchange. Island platforms are popular on twin-track routes due to pragmatic and cost reasons. They are also useful within larger stations where local and express services for the same direction of travel can be provided from opposite sides of the same platform thereby simplifying transfers between the two tracks. An alternative arrangement is to position side platforms on either side of the tracks.
The historical use of island platforms depends greatly upon the location. In the United Kingdom the use of island platforms is relatively common when the railway line is in a cutting or raised on an embankment, as this makes it easier to provide access to the platform without walking across the tracks.

Advantages and tradeoffs
Island platforms are necessary for any station with many through platforms. There are also advantages to building small two-track stations with a single island platform instead of two side platforms. Island platforms allow facilities such as shops, toilets and waiting rooms to be shared between both tracks rather than being duplicated or present only on one side. An island platform makes it easier for disabled travellers to change services between tracks or access facilities. If the tracks are above or below the entrance level, the station needs only one staircase and (if disabled accessibility is necessary) one elevator or ramp to allow access to the platforms. If the tracks are at the same level as the entrance, this instead creates a disadvantage; a side platform arrangement allows one platform to be adjacent to the entrance, whereas an island platform arrangement requires both tracks to be accessed by a bridge or underpass.

If an island platform is not wide enough to cope with passenger numbers, overcrowding can be a problem.

An island platform requires the tracks to diverge around the center platform, and extra width is required along the right-of-way on each approach to the station, especially on high-speed lines. Track centers vary for rail systems throughout the world but are normally 3 to 5 metres. If the island platform is 6 metres wide, the tracks must slew out by the same distance. While this requirement is not a problem on a new line under construction, it makes building a new station on an existing line impossible without altering the tracks. A single island platform also makes it quite difficult to have through tracks (used by trains that do not stop at that station), which are usually between the local tracks (where the island would be).

A common configuration in busy locations on high speed lines is a pair of island platforms, with slower trains diverging from the main line (or using a separate level on the railway's right-of-way) so that the main line tracks remain straight. High-speed trains can therefore pass straight through the station, while slow trains pass around the platforms (such as at Kent House in London). This arrangement also allows the station to serve as a point where slow trains can be passed by faster trains. A variation at some stations is to have the slow and fast pairs of tracks each served by island platforms (as is common on the New York City Subway; the Broad Street Line of Philadelphia; and the Chicago Transit Authority's Red and Purple lines). 

A rarer layout, present at Mets-Willets Point on the IRT Flushing Line, 34th Street – Penn Station on the IRT Seventh Avenue Line and 34th Street – Penn Station on the IND Eighth Avenue Line of the New York City Subway, uses two side platforms for local services with an island in between for express services. The purpose of this atypical design was to reduce unnecessary passenger congestion at a station with a high volume of passengers. Since the IRT Seventh Avenue Line and IND Eighth Avenue Line have adjacent express stations at 42nd Street, passengers can make their transfers from local to express trains there, leaving more space available for passengers utilizing intercity rail at Pennsylvania Station. The Willets Point Boulevard station was renovated to accommodate the high volume of passengers coming to the 1939 World's Fair.

Examples 
Many of the stations on the Great Central Railway in England (now almost entirely closed) were constructed in this form. This was because the line was planned to connect to a Channel Tunnel. If this happened, the lines would need to be compatible with continental loading gauge, and this would mean it would be easy to change the line to a larger gauge, by moving the track away from the platform to allow the wider bodied continental rolling stock to pass freely while leaving the platform area untouched.

Island platforms are a very normal sight on Indian railway stations. Almost all railway stations in India consist of island platforms.

Australia 
In Sydney, on the Eastern Suburbs Railway and the Epping Chatswood Railway, the twin tunnels are widely spaced and the tracks can remain at a constant track centres while still leaving room for the island platforms. A slight disadvantage is that crossovers have to be rather long. Examples in Melbourne include West Footscray, Middle Footscray, Albion and Tottenham on the Sunbury line, and Watsonia and Heidelberg on the Hurstbridge line.

Canada 
In Toronto, 29 subway stations use island platforms (a few in the newer stations on the Bloor–Danforth line, a few on the Yonge–University line and all of the Sheppard line).

In Edmonton, all 18 LRT stations on the Capital Line and Metro Line use island platforms. The Valley Line under construction, utilizes the new low-floor LRT technology, but will only use island platforms on one of the twelve stops along the line.

Singapore 
Almost all of the elevated stations in Singapore's Mass Rapid Transit (MRT) system use island platforms. The exceptions are Dover MRT station and Canberra MRT station, which use side platforms as they are built on an existing rail line, also known as an infill station. Gul Circle uses a stacked island platform configuration. The same follows for underground stations, with the exception being Braddell MRT station, Bishan MRT station, Ang Mo Kio MRT station, and a few stations on the Downtown Line (Stevens, Downtown, Telok Ayer, Chinatown and MacPherson) and the Thomson-East Coast Line (Napier, Maxwell, Shenton Way and Marina Bay)

United States 
In southern New Jersey and Philadelphia, PATCO uses island platforms in all of its 13 stations, to facilitate one-person train operation. The NYC Subway's Second Avenue Subway features island platforms at all stations. Many other stations in the system have the same layout.

Unused sides of island platforms 
Sometimes when the track on one side of the platform is unused by passenger trains, that side may be fenced off. Examples include Hurlstone Park, Lewisham, Sydney and Yeronga, Brisbane.

In New York City's subway system, unused sides are located at Bowling Green as well as every express station without express service, such as Pelham Parkway on the IRT Dyre Avenue line. In Jersey City, the Newport PATH station has the same configuration as Bowling Green—one side platform and one island platform.

On JR East, the Yokosuka Line platforms at Musashi-Kosugi will feature a similar setup when a new side platform opens in December 2022.

Some stations of the Glasgow Subway have one island platform and one side platform (Hillhead, Buchanan Street, and Ibrox).

In Wellington, New Zealand, unused sides can be found at two stations on the Hutt Valley Line: Waterloo and Petone. Waterloo's island platform was reconfigured to be the down side platform when the station was extensively rebuilt in the late 1980s, with the unused side now facing onto a bus bay. Petone's island platform served the up main line and the suburban loop line until the suburban loop was lifted in the early 1990s. The unused platform now faces onto the station's park-and-ride carpark.

Gallery

See also
 Platform height
 Railway platform
Side platform
Split platform
Spanish solution

References

External links 

Railway platforms